Splendour in Nottingham (more commonly known as Splendour or Splendour Festival) is an annual one-day music festival held in Nottingham, England since 2008. Organised by Nottingham City Council and DHP Concerts, the event is held within Wollaton Park, to the west of Nottingham City Centre.
The first event was held in 2008 as a two-day event featuring artists Kate Nash, Paolo Nutini, Ocean Colour Scene and Rufus Wainwright.
In 2019 the capacity of the festival was 25,000. No concerts were held during the COVID-19 years of 2020 and 2021; for 2022, Splendour returned as a two-day event on 23 and 24 July.

History

2022
Artists include Vicky McClure with the Dementia Choir, Ann Marie, Happy Mondays, Richard Ashcroft, Supergrass, Craig David, The Human League, Razorlight, The Vamps, Ocean Colour Scene, Tom Grennan and local singer Beka. Two stages were used, with a smaller Confetti and Comedy stage sited in the courtyard area.

2019 
2019's festival was held on Saturday, 20 July and headlined by indie band Manic Street Preachers and 2 Tone and ska revival band The Specials, the first time an act has headlined the festival twice (the first time was 2015).

Main Stage: Manic Street Preachers, The Specials, Rag'n'Bone Man, Louisa, The Slow Readers Club, Barns Courtney, Rob Green and NUSIC's Future Sound of Nottingham Winner 2019 (announced soon).
Confetti Stage: All Saints, Ash, Roland Gift (Fine Young Cannibals), The Rifles, The Coronas, Bria and AVA SAINT.
Acoustic Rooms Stage: My Pet Fauxes, Mid November, Esther Van Leuven, Megatrain, Velvet Blush, 94 Gunships, Re Teu, Camille Christel and Laurie Illingworth
Comedy Stage: Andy Robinson, Suzy Bennett, Roger Monkhouse, Vince Atta, Sean Heydon and Nathan Caton.
Fringe Stage: Rhymes Against Humanity, Mrs Mabel Green and The Bar Steward Sons of Val Doonican.

2018
2018's festival was held on Saturday, 21 July, celebrating 10 years of the festival. The festival was headlined by pop star and BRIT Award winner, Paloma Faith.

Main Stage: Paloma Faith, The Charlatans, Marc Almond, Bjorn Again, Sophie Ellis-Bextor, Ady Suleiman, Nina Smith and NUSIC's Future Sound of Nottingham Winner 2018, The Dandylions.
Confetti Stage: The Stranglers, Embrace, Peace, Ferocious Dog, Toploader and Ashfields.
Acoustic Rooms Stage: To Kill A King, George Gadd, Soham De, Joey Costello, Re Teu, Katie Cooper and Daisy Godfrey.
Comedy Stage: Brian Krysstal, Dave Twentyman, Andrew Bird, Patrick Monaham, Alan Hudson and The Raymond and Mr Timpkins Revue.

2017
2017's festival was held on Saturday, 22 July. The festival was headlined by indie band and BRIT Award winners, Kaiser Chiefs.

Main Stage: Kaiser Chiefs, Busted, Tony Hadley (ex Spandau Ballet), Gabrielle Aplin, Will Varley, Yola Carter, Georgie and NUSIC's Future Sound of Nottingham Winner 2017, Brotherhood
Confetti Stage: Billy Ocean, Black Grape, British Sea Power, Buzzcocks, Bud, Josh Wheatley and Easy Life
Acoustic Rooms Stage: Into The Ark, Young T & Bugsy, Unknown Era, Tom Lumley, Sunflower Thieves, Yazmin Lacey, Jimi Mack, Lisa Hendricks and Billie
Comedy Stage: Barry Dodds, Scott Bennett, Steve Royle, Jollyboat, Wes Zaharuk and Jim Smallman

2016
2016's festival was held on Saturday, 23 July. The festival was headlined by pop star Jess Glynne, who cancelled her appearance in 2015 to receive vocal surgery.

Main Stage: Jess Glynne, The Human League, UB40, Jamie Lawson, Turin Brakes, Jeremy Loops, Ady Suleiman and NUSIC's Future Sound of Nottingham Winner 2016, Super Furniture
Confetti Stage: The Darkness, The Fratellis, The Rifles, Stiff Little Fingers, Louis Berry, These Your Children and Eyre Llew
Acoustic Rooms Stage: Will Varley, Brad Dear, Tom McCartney, Bru-C, Ellie Keegan, Josh Wheatley, Raphael Blake and Lowrie
Comedy Stage: John Ryan, Patrick Monahan, Ivan Brackenbury, El Baldiniho, Tom Binns and Vince Atta

2015
2015's festival was held on Saturday, 18 July. The festival was headlined by 2 Tone and ska revival band, The Specials, with a special guest appearance from rock band, James.

Main Stage: The Specials, James, Lawson, IndianaNB, Roots Manuva, Amber Run, To Kill a King and NUSIC's Future Sound of Nottingham Winner 2015, Suspect Alibi (with special guest Josh Wheatley)
Confetti Stage: Bananarama, The Twang, Ferocious Dog, Iris Gold, Keto, The Swiines and Georgie
Acoustic Rooms Stage: Hhymm, Joy Mumford, Eyre Llew, Pierce Brothers, Jamie Lawson, Martin Luke Brown, Daudi Matsiko, Molly and Jack, RJMarks and Cedric Peters
Comedy Stage: Andy Robinson (Compère), Jollyboat, Ian D Montford, Ellie Taylor, Christian Reilly and John Robertson

Jess Glynne was set to play the Main Stage. However, due to her vocal cord surgery in 2015, she was forced to pull out just weeks before the festival and was replaced by Indiana.

2014
2014's festival was held on Saturday, 19 July. It was from 2014 that the festival became sponsored by Nottingham's very own Confetti instead of Jägermeister. The festival was headlined by singer-songwriter and BRIT Award winner, Tom Odell and rock band, Happy Mondays.

Main Stage: Tom Odell, Happy Mondays, Scouting For Girls, Foxes, Saint Raymond, The Beat (British band), Ron Pope and NUSIC's Future Sound of Nottingham Winner 2014, Joy Mumford
Confetti Stage: The Boomtown Rats, Reverend & The Makers, The Rifles (band), A Plastic Rose, Amber Run, Uncle Frank and Keto
Acoustic Rooms Stage: Noah, Billy Lockett, Bud, Bitter Stings, Gallery 47, Fields, Ryan Thomas, Frankie Rudolf and George Holroyd
Comedy Stage: Brendan Riley (Compère), Nick Page, Gerry K, Steve Royle, Patrick Monahan and The Raymond and Mr Timpkins Revue

2013
2013's festival was held on Saturday, 20 July. The festival was headlined by Nottingham's own, Jake Bugg.

Main Stage: Jake Bugg, Squeeze, KT Tunstall, Dog Is Dead, Nina Nesbitt, Jack Savoretti, Indiana and NUSIC's Future Sound of Nottingham Winner 2013, The Gorgeous Chans 
Jägermeister Stage: Maxïmo Park, Peter Hook & The Light, Kagoule, Park Bench Society, Rob Green, Saint Raymond and Ferocious Dog
NCN Courtyard Stage: Ryan Keen, Harleighblu, Joel Baker, Gavin James, Injured Birds, Georgie Rose, Ryan Thomas and OneGirlOneBoy
Comedy Stage: Craig Murray, Andrew Bird, Raymond and Mr Timpkins Revue, Martin Mor, Andy Robinson and Mickey D

2012
2012s festival was held on Saturday, 21 July. The festival was headlined by MC and rapper, Dizzee Rascal.

Main Stage: Dizzee Rascal, Razorlight, Katy B, Hard-Fi, Bjorn Again, Jake Bugg, NUSIC's Future Sound of Nottingham Winner 2012, The Afterdark Movement 
Jägermeister Stage: Levellers, Ronika, The Lightning Seeds, To Kill a King, Vadoinmessico, Kappa Gamma, The Barnum Meserve, Sinners Highway
Leftlion Courtyard Stage: Josh Keogh, Opie Dieno, Indiana, Saint Raymond, Rob Green, Nina Smith, Ryan Keen, Miss 600, Natalie Duncan
Comedy Stage: Vince Atta, The Raymond & Mr Timkins Revue, Anil Desai, Nick Beaton, Scottish Falsetto Sock Puppet Theatre, Dave Twentyman (compère)

2011
2011s festival was held on Sunday, 24 July. The festival was headlined by pop/rock band Scissor Sisters and rock band Blondie.

Main Stage: Scissor Sisters, Blondie, Eliza Doolittle, Cast, Justin Currie, Sam Duckworth
Secondary Stage: Feeder, The Bluetones, Dog Is Dead, The Virginmarys, Romance, Swimming, Royal Gala, Harleighblu
LeftLion Courtyard Stage: Scott Matthews, The Petebox, Cecille Grey, Luke Bingham, Allie Moss, Gallery 47, Jake Bugg
Comedy Stage: Nick Page (compère), Andy White, Wes Zaharuk, Roger Monkhouse, Patrick Monahan, Dan Evens

2010

2010s festival was held on Saturday, 24 July. The festival was headline by synth-pop duo, Pet Shop Boys. Music producer, Calvin Harris also appeared at the festival.

Main Stage: Pet Shop Boys, Calvin Harris, Noisettes, Athlete, OK Go, The Leisure Society, Ronika
Right field Stage: Shed Seven, Terrorvision, Fyfe Dangerfield,  Celine and Nite Wreckage, Dog is Dead, Frontiers, Fists, The Wax Dramatic.
Small World Stage: Talvin Singh, Rango, Jaipur Kawa Brass Band, T and Latouche, Asere, Bayou Seco, Hhymn, I Only Date Models.
LeftLion Courtyard Stage: James Walsh, Marcus Foster, Pete Lawrie, Nadine Shah, Nina Smith, Liam Bailey, Jay Thomas

2009
2009s festival was held on Saturday, 18 July. The festival was headlined by ska band Madness.

Artists performing: Madness, The Pogues, Fun Lovin' Criminals, Imelda May, The Rifles, Kid British, Dog Is Dead

2008
The first Splendour festival was held on 19 and 20 July. The festival was headlined by singer-songwriters Kate Nash and Paolo Nutini.

Artists performing on Saturday, the 19th: Kate Nash, The Charlatans, Ocean Colour Scene, Tom Baxter, Lightspeed Champion, The Recovery
Artists performing on Sunday, the 20th: Paolo Nutini, Rufus Wainwright, The Lemonheads, Duke Special, Sam Beeton, Liam Gerner, House of Brothers

References

2008 establishments in England
Culture in Nottingham
Music festivals in Nottinghamshire
Recurring events established in 2008